Temnora peckoveri is a moth of the family Sphingidae. It is known from Madagascar.

The forewing upperside is very similar to Temnora fumosa fumosa, but the ground colour is darker brown so that the dark antemedian and postmedian bands are not as conspicuous. The hindwing underside ground colour is grey. The median band is inconspicuous except for a strong black spot.

References

Temnora
Moths described in 1876
Moths of Madagascar
Moths of the Comoros
Moths of Seychelles